Omorgus nodosus is a beetle of the family Trogidae.

References 

nodosus
Beetles described in 1940